La Unión is a municipality in the Guatemalan department of Zacapa.

External links
Town website (in Spanish)

Municipalities of the Zacapa Department